The 2001–02 Israeli Women's Cup (Gvia HaMedina Nashim) was the 4th season of Israel's women's nationwide football cup competition.

The competition was won by Maccabi Haifa who had beaten Hapoel Tel Aviv 5–0 in the final.

Results

First round

Quarter-finals

Semi-finals

Final

References
2001–2002 Israeli Women's Cup Results Women's Football in Israel (via Internet Archive) 

Israel Women's Cup seasons
Cup
Israel